Tony Williams (born June 21, 1978) is a former American basketball player. He played in the Asociación Deportiva Atenas for 14 seasons after playing college basketball with the Louisville Cardinals and becoming one of the school's 1000-point scorers.

He is now the head basketball coach at Doss High School.

He was a member of CardinalSportsZone.com after playing and before coaching.

References

1978 births
Living people
Basketball players from Louisville, Kentucky
Atenas basketball players
Louisville Cardinals men's basketball players
Doss High School alumni
American men's basketball players